The lesser grison (Galictis cuja) is a species of mustelid from South America.

Description
Lesser grisons have a long, slender body, short legs, and a bushy tail. They have a long neck and a small head with a flattened forehead and rounded ears. Females are slighter smaller and more slender than males.

The top of the head, the back and flanks, and the tail have coarse black guard hairs with buff-coloured tips over a softer undercoat, giving them a grizzled greyish colour. The remainder of the body is black or nearly so, apart from a pale buff-coloured stripe running from the forehead to the shoulders along the lower margin of the grey furred area. The feet are webbed, with five toes ending in sharp, curved, claws.

Distribution and habitat
Lesser grisons are found throughout most of southern South America from sea level to as high as  elevation. They are found in a wide range of habitats, although generally near water, including grasslands, forests, scrub, and mountain meadows. They are also known to inhabit agricultural land and pasture in some areas.

Four subspecies are recognised:
 Galictis cuja cuja – southwestern Bolivia, western Argentina, central Chile
 Galictis cuja furax – southern Brazil, northeastern Argentina, Uruguay, and Paraguay
 Galictis cuja huronax – south-central Bolivia, eastern Argentina
 Galictis cuja luteola – extreme southern Peru, western Bolivia and northern Chile

Biology and behaviour
Lesser grisons are carnivorous, feeding on small to medium rodents, as well as rabbits, birds, frogs, lizards, and snakes. They are among the major predators on cavies, including wild guinea pigs, and also of nesting grebes.

They are semi-plantigrade, walking partly on the soles of their feet, and, despite the webbing, their feet are adapted more for running and climbing than for swimming. They possess anal scent glands that spray a noxious chemical similar to, but probably weaker than, that of skunks. They are monogamous, hunting together when raising their litters of two to five young.

Lesser grisons hunt primarily during the day, locating their prey at least partly by scent. They are either solitary, or live in small family groups of parents and offspring, which travel together in single file. They are said to be particularly fierce, and to play with their food for up to 45 minutes before eating it. During the night, they sleep in hollow trees or natural crevices, or else in excavated burrows.

Relations with humans
Lesser grisons can be tamed if raised from a young age. They were used in the past to hunt wild chinchillas, pursuing them down burrows in a similar manner to ferrets, although chinchillas are now too rare for this to be viable. They are still sometimes kept to control rodents on farms, although they may also be hunted, especially where they are thought to prey on domestic poultry. They have also been reported to be amongst the most frequent species among mammalian roadkill in Brazil.

Lesser grisons can act as a reservoir for Chagas disease.

The bodies of lesser grisons have also been used as magical charms in Bolivia, where their pelts are stuffed with wool and decorated with ribbons and paper to be used in ritual offerings to Pachamama. One apparent sacrificial burial from Argentina has been dated to 1,420 BP. It was interred together with human remains, wearing a decorated collar, placed on an animal pelt and associated with numerous other funerary goods and bodies of mice.

References

Mammals of Argentina
Mammals of Brazil
Mammals of Bolivia
Mammals of Chile
Mammals of Paraguay
Mammals of Peru
Mammals described in 1782
Taxa named by Juan Ignacio Molina